The seventh and final season of Medium, an American television series, premiered on CBS September 24, 2010 and ended on January 21, 2011. The season premiered to only 6.10 million viewers while the season and series finale got 7.87 million viewers the highest in over a year since 6.12 on January 15, 2010. This is the last season on CBS until its cancellation in 2010.

Production 
CBS renewed Medium for a seventh season in May 2010, and was moved into the 8:00pm Friday night slot replacing the cancelled Ghost Whisperer. On October 26, 2010, CBS cut the episode order from 22 down to 13, due to ratings erosion. On November 15, 2010, Patricia Arquette told Entertainment Weekly that the show "got canceled" and had only two more episodes to shoot. She also said the writers were excited that they would be able to end the show properly. On November 18, 2010, series creator Glenn Gordon Caron posted to both the Medium Facebook page and the CBS forums, stating that the show had been canceled and that the series finale would be broadcast on January 21, 2011. CBS confirmed the cancellation with a press release on December 21, 2010, which also confirmed the series finale date of January 21.

Plot 
Ariel departs for Dartmouth College this season. Allison and Joe's relationship begins to dwindle, with the two not seeing eye to eye on everything from work to the girls, to waking up to a "different" Allison every day. In the season four's "Burn Baby Burn" episode Allison tells Joe's mother Marjorie that she will be fine, however in season seven Marjorie passes away from cancer in the episode Blood on the Tracks and she warns Allison about the darkness ahead of them. 

Lee Scanlon deals with his deceased brother for a few episodes and admits to Allison that he had let him be killed.  Devalos decides to run for Mayor of Phoenix, and Allison and Joe both plan to enroll in school which causes tension between them. Allison's half brother Michael returns after a three-season absence, this time played by Patricia's real life brother David Arquette (Ryan Hurst was unavailable due to commitments to Sons of Anarchy). 

In the series finale, Joe is killed in a plane crash on his way back from a business trip in Hawaii. Seven years later, Allison has become the assistant DA, Devalos has become the Mayor. 14-year-old Marie is the last DuBois child still living at home, as Bridgette is in college and not present in the episode and a pregnant and married Ariel remains on the East Coast. While Allison is working on a trial, she seems to have visions of Joe actually surviving the crash but with amnesia. Allison makes a decision to find Joe, sacrificing her own career and her life in the United States.

Cast and characters

Main cast 
 Patricia Arquette as Allison DuBois
 Jake Weber as Joe DuBois
 Miguel Sandoval as Manuel Devalos
 David Cubitt as Lee Scanlon
 Sofia Vassilieva as Ariel DuBois
 Feodor Lark as Bridgette DuBois

Recurring cast 
 Madison and Miranda Carabello as Marie DuBois
 Bruce Gray as the ghost of Joe DuBois' father; the viewer never learns his first name
 Tina DiJoseph as Lynn DiNovi
 Kathy Baker as Marjorie DuBois, Joe's mother
 Roxanne Hart as Lily Devalos
 Dean Norris as Scanlon's deceased brother
 David Arquette as Allison Dubois's brother, Michael 
 John Glover as Carson Churchill

Episodes 

{{Episode table
|background=#764D10
|overall=2
|season=2
|title=20
|writer=18
|director=14
|airdate=15
|country=U.S.
|viewers=9
|episodes=

United States ratings

References

External links 
 
 

Medium (TV series) seasons
2010 American television seasons
2011 American television seasons